Lauf may refer to:

 Lauf an der Pegnitz, town in Bavaria, Germany
 Lauf (Baden), municipality in Baden-Württemberg, Germany
Lauf Cycling, an Icelandic cyclocross company

See also 
 Hans Freiherr von Geyer zu Lauf (1895–1959), German painter
 The Way Things Go (German: Der Lauf der Dinge), a 1987 art film by the Swiss artist duo Peter Fischli and David Weiss
 Lauff